Hutto is a German surname, which was introduced into the United States in the 18th century. It is most commonly found in the southern United States.

In 1962 Edgar Hutto published a 47-page book describing Isaac Hutto's journey to America, entitled Isaac (Otto) Hutto from the German Rhine to the Edisto in Carolina.

Famous people with the surname Hutto include:
Benjamin Hutto (1947–2015), president of the Royal School of Church Music
C. Bradley Hutto (born 1957), member of the South Carolina Senate
David Hutto (born 1977), American rapper who performs under the moniker Boondox.
Earl Hutto (1926–2020), U.S. Representative from Florida
J. B. Hutto (1926–1983), American blues musician
James Emory Hutto, Sr (1824–1914), Founder of Hutto, Williamson County, Texas

Hutto can also refer to the T. Don Hutto Residential Center in Texas, used to detain immigrants.
Which is near Hutto, Texas.

References

German-language surnames